Sir Joseph Pulley, 1st Baronet,  (8 September 1822 – 5 August 1901), was an English Liberal politician.

Pulley was the son of Joseph Pulley of Bayswater and his wife Fanny Oldaker. He was a J. P. and Deputy Lieutenant  for Herefordshire.

Pulley stood unsuccessfully for parliament at Hereford in 1874 and 1878 and was elected Member of Parliament for the constituency in 1880. He held the seat until 1886.

Pulley was created baronet of Lower Eaton, Hereford, in 1893. He died at the age of 78 without issue and the baronetcy became extinct.

He married Mary Jane Burgess in 1860, but they had no children. Pulley's sister Letitia married Thomas A. Oldaker, an estate agent, and in 1902 their daughter Emma Maud Oldaker married Captain William Davies, with many descendants.

References

External links 
 

1822 births
1901 deaths
Baronets in the Baronetage of the United Kingdom
Liberal Party (UK) MPs for English constituencies
UK MPs 1880–1885
UK MPs 1885–1886
Deputy Lieutenants of Herefordshire